Mammuthus creticus, or the Cretan dwarf mammoth, is an extinct species of dwarf mammoth endemic to Crete. It is only known from a single locality near Chania, which probably dates to the Early or Middle Pleistocene. With a shoulder height of about 1 m and a weight of about 310 kg, it was the smallest mammoth that ever existed. After DNA research published in 2006, it was proposed to rename Palaeoloxodon creticus into Mammuthus creticus (Bate, 1907). Others proposed (in 2002) to rename all the described specimens of larger size under the new subspecies name Elephas antiquus creutzburgi (Kuss, 1965). In a study of 2007, it was argued for the groundlessness of the theory by Poulakakis et al. in 2006, showing that the DNA research was likely flawed. However, morphological data supports a placement in Mammuthus. It probably derived from Mammuthus meridionalis, or less likely, Mammuthus rumanus.

References

Mammoths
Prehistoric Crete
Prehistoric mammals of Europe
Fauna of Crete